Alan Lew (1943–2009) was a Conservative rabbi best known for establishing the world's first Jewish meditation center and for his work bridging Jewish and Buddhist traditions. Lew was often described as "the Zen rabbi," a phrase that he himself used in the title of his book One God Clapping: The Spiritual Path of a Zen Rabbi.

Biography
Born in Brooklyn, New York, Lew grew up in a secular Jewish household. In the 1960s, he experimented with Asian spiritual practices and eventually discovered Zen Buddhism. When preparing for ordination as a Zen Buddhist priest, he had an epiphany regarding his Jewish identity which set him on a path to exploring Judaism. Lew went on to become a Conservative rabbi, leading Congregation Beth Sholom in San Francisco, California, and focusing on teaching meditation in Jewish contexts. He established the Makor Or meditation center at Beth Sholom, the world's first synagogue-based Jewish meditation center. He has been noted for his books and for his work on how meditation plays an important role in the process of teshuvah (repentance).

Selected works
One God Clapping: The Spiritual Path of a Zen Rabbi (1999)
This Is Real and You Are Completely Unprepared: The Days of Awe as a Journey of Transformation (2003)
Be Still and Get Going: A Jewish Meditation Practice for Real Life (2007)

References 

1943 births
2009 deaths
People from Brooklyn
People from San Francisco
American Conservative rabbis
Zen in the United States
Buddhism and Judaism
20th-century American rabbis
21st-century American Jews